These are the official results of the men's hammer throw event at the 1997 World Championships in Athens, Greece. There were a total number of 43 participating athletes, with the final held on Sunday 3 August 1997.

Medalists

Schedule
All times are Eastern European Time (UTC+2)

Abbreviations
All results shown are in metres

Records

Qualification

Group A

Group B

Final

See also
 1996 Men's Olympic Hammer Throw (Atlanta)
 1997 Hammer Throw Year Ranking
 1998 Men's European Championships Hammer Throw (Budapest)
 2000 Men's Olympic Hammer Throw (Sydney)

References
 IAAF results
 hammerthrow.wz

H
Hammer throw at the World Athletics Championships